Caldwell Carnegie Library may refer to:

Caldwell Carnegie Library (Caldwell, Idaho), listed on the National Register of Historic Places in Canyon County, Idaho
Caldwell Carnegie Library (Caldwell, Kansas), listed on the National Register of Historic Places in Sumner County, Kansas